Maren Schwerdtner (born 3 October 1985) is a German heptathlete. Born in Hanover.

Achievements

References
 

1985 births
Living people
German heptathletes
Sportspeople from Hanover
20th-century German women
21st-century German women